Don León Apacíble (October 25, 1861 – 1901)  was a Filipino lawyer, judge, propagandist, and revolutionary.

Biography 
He met national hero José Rizal while attending Ateneo Municipal de Manila. He boarded with Rizal and his brother, Galicano, who also became one of the political figures of the revolution. Leon’s mother asked Rizal to be her son’s advisor and guide. Like Rizal, Leon excelled in school and later studied law at the University of Sto. Thomas. Leon earned his licentiate in jurisprudence at only 23 years old. He practiced law in Batangas where he also found Masonry. After, he became a judge of the Court of First Instance of Batangas City.

In 1890, his house in Taal became one of the meeting places of the resistance leaders. In 1892, he was deported to Lepanto, now called the Bontoc Province of in the Cordilleras. He was released from exile after the signing of the Pact of Biak-na-Bato. When he returned to Batangas, he joined General Miguel Malvar’s forces and became his right hand man. In 1898, Apacible led his own force of soldiers against Spain in capturing Batangas City. That year he was appointed as the Finance Officer of Batangas by President Emilio Aguinaldo.

In 1901, Leon Apacible was mysteriously lost at sea. His only son, Leon Jr., married Consolacion Noble and their only daughter, Corazon Apacible Cañisa, became mayor of Taal in 1975.

Collections
 A kalesa owned by the family of León Apacible, a member of the commission that drafted the Malolos Constitution displayed in the Presidential Car Museum in Quezon Memorial Circle, Quezon City, Philippines.

References 

19th-century Filipino lawyers
Filipino revolutionaries
1861 births
1901 deaths